Tunisia made its Paralympic Games debut at the 1988 Summer Paralympics in Seoul. It was represented by a single athlete, Monaam Elabed, who won two bronze medals in athletics. The country has competed in every subsequent edition of the Summer Paralympics, although it has never taken part in the Winter Paralympics. Tunisian competitors have only ever taken part in athletics events, with the sole exception of Dalila Tabai who competed in powerlifting in 2000.

Tunisians have won a total of 23 gold medals, 22 silver and 9 bronze.  The country's first gold medals came in 2000, when Wissam Ben Bahri took gold in the high jump, Ali Ghribi in the pentathlon, Fares Hamdi in the long jump, and Maher Bouallegue won three gold medals in running - in the 800 m, 1,500 m and 5,000 m races, in the T13 category for partially sighted athletes. In 2004, Bouallegue won three gold again - in the 1,500 m 5,000 m and 10,000 m events. The same year, Enna Ben Abidi took gold in the discus; Mohamed Charmi in the 1,500 m race in the T37 category; and Afrah Gomdi in both javelin and shot put. Tunisia also won gold in the men's 4x400 m race, in the T35-38 category. Most recently, in 2008, Somaya Bousaid won the 800 m and 1,500 m races in the T13 category, while Farhat Chida took gold in both the 400 m race (T38) and in the long jump. Mourad Idoudi won the club throw and discus (F32/51); Faouzi Rzig the javelin (F33/34/52); Raoua Tlili the shot put (F40); and Abderrahim Zhiou the 800 m (T12).

Tunisia participated at the 1999 Arab Paralympics, held in Amman, Jordan.  Tunisia won twelve gold medals, eight silver medals, and two bronze medals at the event. They finished fifth out of sixteen nations that competed at the games.

Tunisia will be taking part in the 2012 Summer Paralympics, and the Tunisian Paralympic Committee have chosen Bedford as the UK training base for its Paralympians.

Medals

Medals by Summer Games

Medals by Summer Sport 
Source:

Medalists

See also
 Tunisia at the Olympics

References